Adam Elias von Siebold (5 March 1775, Würzburg – 12 June 1828, Berlin) was a German Gynecologist.

Life 
He was the youngest son of Carl Caspar von Siebold (1736–1807).  Siebold was professor of anatomy, surgery und midwifery of the University of Würzburg. Unlike his brothers, he originally wanted to become a Merchant, eventually, however, he began to study medicine.

Through his teachings he influenced Johann Christian Stark (1753–1811) in Jena, Friedrich Benjamin Osiander (1759–1822) in Göttingen and later, Johann Lukas Boër (1751–1835) in Wien.

He authored several textbooks and is attributed to the following quote: Peace and silence, time and patience, respect for nature and the bithgiving woman, and the art of waiting, when Mother Nature rules.

He died aged 53 of a stomach condition.  He was survived by two sons and four daughters, amongst them the doctor and Zoologist Karl Theodor Ernst von Siebold (1804–1885).

Selected works 
 Ausführliche Beschreibungen der Heilquellen zu Kissingen und ihre Auswirkung besonders bei Frauenzimmerkrankheiten, 1828,  .

Legacy 
The Siebold-Gymnasium in Würzburg is named after him.

Notes

Sources
This article (incomplete) is based on the German and Swedish wiki pages (4 Sept 2008)

External links 
 
Biografie

Literaturliste im Online-Katalog der Staatsbibliothek zu Berlin

1775 births
1828 deaths
German gynaecologists
Academic staff of the University of Würzburg